is a Japanese footballer currently playing as a defensive midfielder for Kawasaki Frontale.

Career statistics

Club
.

Notes

References

External links

1997 births
Living people
Japanese footballers
Association football midfielders
J1 League players
Yokohama FC players
Kawasaki Frontale players